Trechus hydropicus is a species of ground beetle in the family Carabidae. It is found in North America.

Subspecies
These four subspecies belong to the species Trechus hydropicus:
 Trechus hydropicus avus Barr, 1962
 Trechus hydropicus beutenmuelleri Jeannel, 1931
 Trechus hydropicus canus Barr, 1962
 Trechus hydropicus hydropicus G. Horn, 1883

References

Further reading

 

hydropicus
Articles created by Qbugbot
Beetles described in 1883